Alice Steinbach (October 10, 1933 – March 13, 2012) was an American journalist and author who won the 1985 Pulitzer Prize for Feature Writing for her feature for The Baltimore Sun A Boy of Unusual Vision, which describes the experience of a blind child.

Biography
Steinbach was born in Roland Park, Maryland, October 10, 1933. She graduated from Western High School in 1951.

Steinbach worked for the Baltimore Sun from 1981 to 1999. She later became an author, freelance writer, and lecturer. She taught writing and journalism at Washington and Lee University, Princeton University, and Loyola College.

References

Pulitzer Prize winners
American women journalists
1933 births
2012 deaths
People from Baltimore
Writers from Maryland
21st-century American women